The Walden Stakes is a discontinued Thoroughbred horse race run from 1906 through 1948 at Pimlico Race Course in Baltimore, Maryland. Raced on dirt, the event was open to two-year-olds horses of either sex. The race was named in honor of Maryland-based trainer and owner Wyndham Walden, a Hall of Fame inductee who won eleven American Classic Races, capturing the Preakness Stakes seven times and the Belmont Stakes four times.

For the first three years the Walden Stakes was contested at a distance of six furlongs, but because it was run in November it was changed in 1909 to one mile so that the year's top class juvenile horses would be tested at a longer distance with a view to their upcoming three-year-old season when races at a mile and longer would be commonplace. Among those top class two-year-olds who won the Walden Stakes were U.S. Racing Hall of Fame inductees Reigh Count (1927) and his son Count Fleet (1943),  Whirlaway (1940), and Alsab (1941). Reigh Count went on to win the 1929 Kentucky Derby, Alsab finished second in the 1942 Kentucky Derby, and both Whirlaway and Count Fleet won the U.S. Triple Crown series. In addition, the 1930 Walden Stakes winner Mate went on to win the 1931 Preakness Stakes.

Race distances:
 1 1/16 miles : 1928-1948
 1 mile : 1909-1927
 6 furlongs :  1906-1908

In 1923, the Walden Stakes was run in two divisions.

Records
Speed record:
 1 mile: 1:39 2/5, Senator Norris  (1923) 
 1 1/16 miles: 1:43 flat, Stone Age (1948)

Most wins by a jockey:
 2 - Tommy McTaggart (1912, 1915)
 2 - Johnny Loftus (1917, 1918)
 2 - Laverne Fator (1919, 1928)
 2 - Don Meade (1932, 1933)
 2 - Wayne Wright (1934, 1935)
 2 - Johnny Longden (1938, 1942)

Most wins by a trainer:
 3 - Sam Hildreth (1910, 1919, 1923)
 3 - Max Hirsch (1926, 1931, 1947)
 3 - Ben A. Jones (1938, 1940, 1946)

Most wins by an owner:
 3 - George D. Widener Jr. (1916, 1933, 1943)

Winners

 Ŧ - In the November 6, 1915 race Celandria finished first but was disqualified.

References

Discontinued horse races in the United States
Flat horse races for two-year-olds
Horse races in Maryland
Pimlico Race Course
Recurring sporting events established in 1906
Recurring sporting events disestablished in 1948
1906 establishments in Maryland
1948 disestablishments in Maryland